Julian, bishop of Halicarnassus (Greek: Ίουλιανός Άλικαρνασσού, d. after 527), also known as Julian the Phantastiast, was an anti-Chalcedonian theologian who contested with Severus of Antioch over the phtharos of Christ. His followers were known as the Aphthartodocetae. He lived in exile for a time in the monastery of the Enaton in Egypt.

Julian believed "that the body of Christ, from the very moment of his conception, was incorruptible, immortal and impassible, as it was after the resurrection, and held that the suffering and death on the cross was a miracle contrary to the normal conditions of Christ's humanity", known as aphthartodocetism.

References

Sources
 

6th-century Byzantine bishops